is a Japanese  film director.  In 1953, he joined the Daiei studio and started working as an assistant director. He made his director debut with Aoi Tsubasa in 1960.

Partial filmography 
 1960: 青い翼　(Aoi Tsubasa)
 1965: 鉄砲犬 (Teppô inu)
 1965: ごろつき犬 (Gorotsuki inu)
 1966: 銭のとれる男 (Zeni no toreru otoko)
 1967: 早射ち犬 (Hayauchi inu)
 1968: 闇を裂く一発  (Yami o saku ippatsu)
 1970: 富士山頂 (Fuji sanchō)
 1975: 鬼の詩 (Oni no uta)
 1978: 月山 (Gassan)
 1982: 遠野物語 (Tono monogatari)
 1991: 上方苦界草紙 Kamigata Kugaizoshi)
 1993: ＫＯＹＡ澄賢房覚え書 (Koya Choken-bou oboegaki)

References

External links 
 
 

Japanese directors
People from Kagoshima
1929 births
Living people